Ptinella is a genus of beetles belonging to the family Ptiliidae.

The genus has almost cosmopolitan distribution.

Species:
 Ptinella acaciae Johnson, 1982 
 Ptinella africana Paulian & Delamare-Deboutteville, 1948

References

Ptiliidae